Port Soderick Railway Station (Manx: Stashoon Raad Yiarn Phurt Soderick) is the first station on the Port Erin line of the Isle of Man Railway and is located near the settlement of the same name on the Isle of Man.  It forms part of the sole remaining section of the railway which once served a 46-mile network across the island.

Access

The B23 road between Douglas and the village provides vehicular access to the station and passes through a tunnel underneath the line after which the station driveway is directly to the left of the road.

Locale

To the eastern end of the station the railway passes over the main road by means of a large stone bridge; at the southerly end the line passes into Crogga Woods from where can be seen the large house and miniature railway.

Development

The station was originally provided with a basic wooden building but by 1898 it had become clear that the popularity of the nearby resort demanded a more substantial building; to this end, the current grandiose station was erected and included station masters' residence, refreshment rooms and booking facilities; the latter has been retained as part of the private house but only as a feature and the station is no longer staffed.

Origins

The station was built primarily to serve the popular coastal resort which is a short walk from the station via one of the Manx National Glens.  Although largely derelict today, this resort was once a hugely popular destination for tourists

Electric Tramway

The resort was also once served by the Douglas Head Marine Drive and Electric Tramway which took a spectacular coastal route from Douglas Head to a point above the beach; this tramway was established in 1896 and closed in 1939 upon the outbreak of war.  A landslide on part of the route saw that it never opened again although the route was modified and operated by omnibuses for a number of years.

Other Transport

Owing to the popularity of the venue it was also served by ferry boats, charabancs and of course the railway.  So popular was the place that the station boasts the only full-height platform at an intermediate station on the south line other than Port St. Mary which, at one time, was intended as the southern terminus.

Improvements

In 2002 all stations received platforms, and the little used passing loop at this station received another (seldom used) full-height platform on the "down" side, together with waiting shelter, indicative of the management policy to provide passenger facilities at each station, seemingly regardless of how well patronised the stations were.

Crogga Valley Railway
To the south of the station is a 7¼ inch gauge miniature railway which is visible from the land side of passing trains. The railway, that runs around the grounds of the house of the same name, is not open to the public.

Manx Nameboards

For the start of the 2008 season the station was adorned with new bi-lingual station nameboards; differing from all other stations on the line insofar as one side (the "up" platform) has the name in English, and the other (the "down" platform, which is rarely used) is in Manx, stating "Purt" as opposed to "Port"; the nameboards feature a yellowy-cream lettering with black shadowing on a maroon coloured back board, the now-standard livery of station nameboards on the line.

Residents

The station building is still extant but in private ownership, having been converted from a derelict state in the 1980s.  Previous owners included Alex Lloyd (racing driver).  It is an imposing large structure, more latterly replaced by two wooden shelters on each platform. The "down" platform was added in 2002 when much of the railway was re-laid as part of the IRIS scheme.

Today

The station remains open but unstaffed; there are two wooden shelters on the platforms.  A further small hut stood at the easterly end of the station to provide accommodation for station staff at the rare times when the station is used for passing of trains until it was destroyed in a storm in 2012.

Incident

On 19 May 2008 there was an incident at the station involving a van and oncoming train which resulted in a collision of the two.  The matter was widely reported in the media but as the train was travelling no faster than 5 miles per hour no injuries were sustained.  There was however much damage to the Vauxhall van and remedial damage to the wooden buffer beam of the 1874-built locomotive which was involved.  Local emergency services attended but train operations were continued later in the same day; a health and safety report has since been commissioned into the incident.

Route

References
 James I.C. Boyd Isle Of Man Railway, Volume 3, The Routes & Rolling Stock (1996) 
 Norman Jones Scenes from the Past: Isle of Man Railway (1994) 
 Robert Hendry Rails in the Isle of Man: A Colour Celebration (1993) 
 A.M Goodwyn Manx Transport Kaleidoscope, 2nd Edition (1995)

See also
 Isle of Man Railway stations
 Port Soderick

Railway stations in the Isle of Man
Railway stations opened in 1874